(Ripped Up or Popped Up) was a 2014 outdoor temporary sculpture located in Széchenyi Square in Budapest, Hungary, by Ervin Hervé-Lóránth. The artwork depicted a giant man emerging from the earth, and was installed as part of the 2014 Art Market Budapest.

Background
The art piece was displayed on the grounds of Gresham Palace during the Art Market Budapest Festival. The art became an internet sensation. Hungarian artist constructed the giant sculpture out of polystyrene and it was installed in 2014. The artist called the work an extremely large example of contemporary art.

Sculpture
The sculpture was  a collaboration between Artist Ervin Herve-Loranth and Gallery Out of Home. It was considered temporary because it was made from polystyrene. The sculpture shows a giant with an angry face who appears to be waking up and coming out from under the earth. It is colored in grays which blend well with the earth. The exhibit invited visitors to interact and take selfies. 

Two interpretations of the piece were articulated by Gallery Out of Home: "The creation has several meanings, such as the symbolism of freedom, the desire to break free, the curiosity, and the dynamics of development."
After the Art Market Budapest, the sculpture was displayed in 4 in Ulm, Germany to celebrate the 1989 revolution.

Reception 
In 2014 his work, also called “Strappato” (Popped up) received an award for "the best work in the world placed in the public area." Architectural Digest called the sculpture one of the 28 most fascinating public sculptures.

References

21st-century sculptures
Outdoor sculptures in Hungary
Tourist attractions in Budapest